Ron Janzen (born 5 January 1994) is a Dutch professional footballer who plays as a centre back, most recently for Helmond Sport in the Dutch Eerste Divisie. He formerly played for FC Groningen, SC Cambuur, and RKC Waalwijk.

Career

Club career
In September 2019 it was confirmed, that Janzen had returned to his former youth club VV Gorecht. In February 2020, Janzen signed a pre-contract with Flevo Boys for the 2020-21 season.

References

1994 births
Living people
People from Midden-Drenthe
Association football central defenders
Dutch footballers
SC Cambuur players
Helmond Sport players
RKC Waalwijk players
Eredivisie players
Eerste Divisie players
Flevo Boys players
Footballers from Drenthe